Copamyntis is a genus of snout moths (family Pyralidae). It was erected by Edward Meyrick in 1934.

Species
 Copamyntis alectryonura (Meyrick, 1932)
 Copamyntis ceroprepiella
 Copamyntis infusella (Meyrick)
 Copamyntis leptocosma
 Copamyntis martimella Kirpichnikova & Yamanaka, 2002
 Copamyntis obliquifasciella Hampson 1896
 Copamyntis prays
 Copamyntis spodoptila

References

Phycitini
Pyralidae genera